Stuart Dryburgh (born 30 March 1952 in London) is an English-born New Zealand cinematographer, now working in Hollywood. He completed a degree in architecture at the University of Auckland, but subsequently moved into the film industry. He was nominated for the Academy Award for Best Cinematography for his work on the 1993 romance film, The Piano, but lost to Janusz Kamiński for Schindler's List. Dryburgh was also nominated for an Emmy for his work on the Boardwalk Empire pilot.

Personal life
He lives in Brooklyn, New York.

Filmography

Film

Television

References 

Profile in New Zealand Listener Volume 148, 20 May 2010, pages 44–45

External links 
 

New Zealand cinematographers
1952 births
Living people
University of Auckland alumni
English emigrants to New Zealand